Berthold of Moosburg (died after 1361) was a German Dominican theologian and neo-Platonist of the 14th century, teaching in Regensburg in 1327.

His Expositio super Elementationem theologicam Procli, written between 1340 and 1361, was a major statement of the importance for Platonism of Proclus. He opposed his Christian-Platonic synthesis to Aristotelian philosophy. His sources included Theodoric of Freiberg and Albertus Magnus.

Works
 Expositio super elementationem theologicam Procli 184-211. De animabus, edited by Loris Sturlese, Rome, Edizioni di storia e letteratura, 1974.
 Bertoldo di Moosburg, Tabula contentorum in Expositione super Elementationem theologicam Procli, edited by A. Beccarisi, Pisa, Scuola Normale Superiore, 2000.
 Expositio super Elementationem theologicam Procli, in Corpus philosophorum Teutonicorum medii aevi, vol. 6, edited by Loris Sturlese:
 6/1: Prologus. Propositiones 1-13, Meiner, Hamburg 1984. 
 6/2: Propositiones 14-34, Meiner, Hamburg 1986. 
 6/3: Propositiones 35-65, Meiner, Hamburg 2001. 
 6/4: Propositiones 66-107, Meiner, Hamburg 2003. 
 6/6: Propositiones 136–159, Meiner, Hamburg 2007 
 6/7: Propositiones 160-183, Meiner, Hamburg 2003

References

 Markus Fűhrer, Stephen Gersh, Dietrich of Freiberg and Berthold of Moosburg, in Stephen Gersh (ed.), Interpreting Proclus from Antiquity to the Renaissance, Cambridge: Cambridge University Press, 2014, pp. 299-317.
 Antonella Sannino, Berthold of Moosburg's Hermetic Sources, Journal of the Warburg and Courtauld Institutes, Vol. 63, 2000 (2000), pp. 243–258

Notes

See also 
 Neoplatonism
 Proclus
 Theodoric of Freiberg

14th-century German Catholic theologians
German Dominicans
Scholastic philosophers
14th-century Christian monks
14th-century German philosophers